At the Battle of Brandywine on September 11, 1777 a colonial American army led by General George Washington fought a British-Hessian army commanded by General William Howe, 5th Viscount Howe. Washington drew up his troops in a defensive position behind Brandywine Creek. Howe sent Lieutenant General Wilhelm von Knyphausen's 5,000 troops to demonstrate against the American front at Chadd's Ford. Meanwhile, Lieutenant General Charles Cornwallis took 10,000 troops on a wide flank march that crossed the creek and got in the rear of the American right wing under Major General John Sullivan. The Americans changed front but Howe's attack broke through.

As Howe's wing made progress, Knyphausen converted his feint into a frontal attack on the American center. Washington's army was driven to the rear in disarray, but was saved from rout by Major General Nathanael Greene's rear guard action. Washington's army retreated to Chester, Pennsylvania while Howe occupied Wilmington, Delaware. The engagement took place in Chadds Ford Township, Delaware County, Pennsylvania.

British Army order of battle

General Sir William Howe (18,000)
Quartermaster General: Brigadier General Sir William Erskine, 1st Baronet

Note: Each brigade had two or four 3-pound or 4-pound cannons attached.

Left Wing
Lieutenant General Lord Cornwallis
 Unbrigaded:
 16th Light Dragoons (200)
 Hessian and Anspach Jägers: Lieutenant Colonel Ludwig von Wurmb (500)
 Mounted Jäger company, Captain Richard Lorey (100)
 Artillery: 3rd Brigade
 Four 12-pound cannons & six 6-pound cannons

 Guards Brigade: Brigadier General Edward Mathew (939)
 Elements of 1st Foot Guard, 2nd Foot Guard, and 3rd Foot Guard Regiments
 1st Battalion (488)
 Grenadier company, Lieutenant Colonel Sir George Osborn, 4th Baronet (124)
 Hyde's company (93)
 Wrottesley's company (91)
 Cox's company (90)
 Garth's company (90)
 2nd Battalion (451)
 Stephen's company (88)
 Murray's company (89)
 O'Hara's company (87)
 Martin's company (91)
 Light company, Lieutenant Colonel Osborn (96)

 Light Infantry: (1,300)
 1st Light Infantry Battalion, Lieutenant Colonel Robert Abercromby of Airthrey
 Light companies of (from left to right in formation) 5th, 15th, 22nd, 27th, 33rd, 38th, 42nd, 35th, 28th, 23rd, 17th, 10th, and 4th Regiments.
 2nd Light Infantry Battalion, Major John Maitland
 Light companies of (from left to right in formation) 37th, 43rd, 45th, 49th, 55th, 63rd, 71st, 64th, 57th, 52nd, 46th, 44th, and 40th Regiments.
 Grenadiers: (1,400)
 1st Grenadier Battalion, Lieutenant Colonel William Medows
 Grenadier companies of (from left to right in formation) 5th, 15th, 22nd, 27th, 33rd, 37th, 40th, 38th, 35th, 28th, 23rd, 17th, 10th, and 4th Regiments
 2nd Grenadier Battalion, Lieutenant Colonel Henry Monckton
 Grenadier companies of (from left to right in formation) 43rd, 49th, 52nd, 57th, 64th, 71st, 63rd, 55th, Marines, 46th, 44th, and 42nd Regiments

 3rd Brigade: Major General Charles Grey, 1st Earl Grey (3,000 in 3rd and 4th Brigades)
 15th Foot
 17th Foot
 42nd Foot
 44th Foot
 4th Brigade: Brigadier General James Agnew
 33rd Foot
 38th Foot
 46th Foot
 64th Foot
 Hessian Brigade: Colonel Carl von Donop (1,300)
 Linsing Grenadier Battalion
 Minningerode Grenadier Battalion
 Lengerke Grenadier Battalion

Right Wing

Lieutenant General Wilhelm von Knyphausen
 Unbrigaded:
 Queen's Rangers, Captain James Weymss (300)
 Rifle Corps, Captain Patrick Ferguson (90)
 16th Light Dragoons (200)
 71st Foot (1,200)
 1st and 3rd battalions guarding the baggage train.
 2nd battalion (350)
 Artillery: 1st and 2nd Brigades
 Six 12-pound cannons & four howitzers
 Hessian Brigade: Major General Johann Daniel Stirn (2,000)
 Erbprinz Infantry Regiment
 Donop Infantry Regiment
 Mirbach Infantry Regiment

 1st Brigade: Major General James Grant (1,400)
 4th Foot
 23rd Foot
 28th Foot
 49th Foot
 2nd Brigade: Major General Grant (1,300)
 5th Foot
 10th Foot
 27th Foot
 40th Foot, Lieutenant Colonel Thomas Musgrave, John Graves Simcoe
 55th Foot

American Army order of battle

General and Commander in Chief George Washington (12,000 regulars, 3,000 militia)

Main Body
 Unattached:
 Chadds Ford redoubt: Colonel Thomas Proctor
 4th Continental Artillery Regiment: One 6-pound gun, two 4-pound guns, one 8-inch howitzer
 Light Infantry Corps: Brigadier General William Maxwell (1,000)
 About 100 soldiers were detached from each regular brigade to form this corps
 North Carolina Brigade: Brigadier General Francis Nash (1,094)
 1st North Carolina Regiment, Colonel Thomas Clark
 2nd North Carolina Regiment, Colonel Alexander Martin
 3rd North Carolina Regiment, Colonel Jethro Sumner
 4th North Carolina Regiment, Colonel Thomas Polk
 5th North Carolina Regiment Colonel Edward Buncombe
 6th North Carolina Regiment, Colonel Gideon Lamb
 7th North Carolina Regiment, Colonel James Hogun
 8th North Carolina Regiment
 9th North Carolina Regiment
 Division: Major General John Armstrong Sr. (2,000)
 1st Pennsylvania Militia Brigade: Brigadier General James Potter
 Philadelphia County Regiment, Moor
 Philadelphia County Regiment, McVaugh
 Bucks County Regiment, Maj. John Folwell
 Lancaster County Regiment, Col. James Watson
 Berks County Regiment, Col. Daniel Hunter
 York County Regiment, Col. James Thompson 
 Cumberland County Regiment, Col. James Dunlap
 Pennsylvania Militia Brigade: Brigadier General James Irvine
 Philadelphia County Regiment, Lt. Col. Jonathan Smith
 Chester County Regiment, Col. William Evans
 Lancaster County Regiment, Col. Philip Greenwalt
 Lancaster County Regiment, Col. Alexander Lowry
 Northampton County Regiment, Col. David Udree

 Division: Major General Nathanael Greene (2,500)
 1st Virginia Brigade: Brigadier General Peter Muhlenberg
 1st Virginia Regiment
 5th Virginia Regiment
 9th Virginia Regiment, Colonel George Mathews
 13th Virginia Regiment
 German Battalion
 2nd Virginia Brigade: Brigadier General George Weedon
 2nd Virginia Regiment
 6th Virginia Regiment
 10th Virginia Regiment
 14th Virginia Regiment
 Pennsylvania State Regiment, Colonel Walter Stewart

 Division: Brigadier General Anthony Wayne (2,000)
 1st Pennsylvania Brigade: Colonel Thomas Hartley
 1st Pennsylvania Regiment, Colonel James Chambers
 2nd Pennsylvania Regiment, Major William Williams
 7th Pennsylvania Regiment
 10th Pennsylvania Regiment, Lieutenant Colonel Adam Hubley
 Hartley's Additional Continental Regiment, Lieutenant Colonel Morgan Connor
 2nd Pennsylvania Brigade: Colonel Richard Humpton
 4th Pennsylvania Regiment
 5th Pennsylvania Regiment, Colonel Francis Johnston
 8th Pennsylvania Regiment
 11th Pennsylvania Regiment, Colonel Richard Humpton

Sullivan's Wing

 Division: Major General John Sullivan (1,100 less 1st Delaware & 2nd Canadian)
 1st Maryland Brigade: Unknown commander (William Smallwood's brigade)
 1st Maryland Regiment
 3rd Maryland Regiment
 7th Maryland Regiment
 1st Delaware Regiment, Colonel David Hall (250)
 2nd Maryland Brigade: Brigadier General Chevalier Philippe Hubert Preudhomme de Borre
 2nd Maryland Regiment
 4th Maryland Regiment, Colonel Josias Carvil Hall
 6th Maryland Regiment
 2nd Canadian Regiment, Colonel Moses Hazen (400)

 Division: Major General Adam Stephen (1,500)
 3rd Virginia Brigade: Brigadier General William Woodford
 3rd Virginia Regiment
 7th Virginia Regiment
 11th Virginia Regiment
 15th Virginia Regiment
 4th Virginia Brigade: Brigadier General Charles Scott
 4th Virginia Regiment
 8th Virginia Regiment
 12th Virginia Regiment
 Grayson's Additional Continental Regiment
 Patton's Additional Continental Regiment

 Division: Major General William Alexander, Lord Stirling (1,500)
 New Jersey Brigade: Brigadier General William Maxwell
 1st New Jersey Regiment, Colonel Matthias Ogden
 2nd New Jersey Regiment
 3rd New Jersey Regiment, Colonel Elias Dayton
 4th New Jersey Regiment
 3rd Pennsylvania Brigade: Brigadier General Thomas Conway
 3rd Pennsylvania Regiment
 6th Pennsylvania Regiment
 9th Pennsylvania Regiment
 12th Pennsylvania Regiment
 Spencer's Additional Continental Regiment

Notes
Footnotes

Citations

References

External links
ushistory.org Regiments at Valley Forge

American Revolutionary War orders of battle